Not Another Teen Movie is a 2001 American teen parody film directed by Joel Gallen and written by Mike Bender, Adam Jay Epstein, Andrew Jacobson, Phil Beauman, and Buddy Johnson. It features an ensemble cast including Chyler Leigh, Chris Evans, Jaime Pressly, Eric Christian Olsen, Eric Jungmann, Mia Kirshner, Deon Richmond, Cody McMains, Sam Huntington, Samm Levine, Cerina Vincent, Ron Lester, Randy Quaid, Lacey Chabert, Riley Smith and Samaire Armstrong.

Released on December 14, 2001, by Columbia Pictures, the film is a parody of teen films. While the general plot is based on She's All That, as well as Varsity Blues, 10 Things I Hate About You, Can't Hardly Wait and  Pretty in Pink, the film is also filled with allusions to teenage and college-age films from the 1980s and 1990s, such as Bring It On, American Pie, Cruel Intentions, American Beauty, Never Been Kissed, Ferris Bueller's Day Off, Can't Buy Me Love, Jawbreaker, Sixteen Candles, Dazed and Confused, Lucas, Rudy, The Breakfast Club, Grease, and Road Trip, while Paul Gleason reprises his role as Vice Principal Vernon from John Hughes' The Breakfast Club (1985).

Plot
In the stereotypical high school community of John Hughes High in Southern California, Priscilla, head cheerleader, separates from her football star but slacker boyfriend, Jake Wyler. Discovering she is now dating timid and weird Les to spite him, one of Jake's friends, Austin, makes a bet with him to turn nerdy Janey Briggs, a "uniquely rebellious girl", into the prom queen. Janey resists his efforts because she is not insecure enough to feel any need to change anything about herself, nor does she feel anything for him at first, but that does not stop him from trying.

As Jake attempts to court Janey, he faces adversity from his own sister, Catherine, who is sexually attracted to him; Janey's unnoticed admirer and best friend, Ricky Lipman; and memories from his past football career. Catherine eventually assists him by "drastically" altering Janey's appearance (simply removing her glasses and ponytail), instantly making her drop-dead gorgeous.

Meanwhile, Janey's younger brother, Mitch, and his friends Ox and Bruce, make a pact to lose their virginity by graduation despite still being freshmen. Mitch tries to impress his longtime crush, Amanda Becker with a love letter. Bruce says that he does not have a chance with her, saying, "Keep dreaming!"

As the prom draws near, Jake becomes known for failing to lead the football team to victory at last year's state championship game. Austin then tricks Jake into telling Janey about his bet to spite Priscilla, pretending to whisper the secret bet in Janey's ear, causing her to immediately leave upset. On prom night, Austin and Janey go together; a jealous Jake and Catherine have a dance-off with Austin and Janey, with Catherine dancing in a sexual manner. Janey runs off crying.

Meanwhile, Mitch and his friends are having a lousy time until Amanda arrives and Mitch gives her the letter (to which she responds she does not have sex with every loser who does such, but gives them handjobs), horny Bruce hooks up with the equally horny international exchange student Areola, and Ox later hooks up with Catherine after sharing a romantic and rather odd connection.

Jake is awarded prom king and the votes for prom queen are tied. Everyone thinks that it is between Janey and Priscilla, but they are shocked to find that conjoined twins Kara and Sara Fratelli win prom queen. During the traditional prom king and queen dance, Janey supposedly left with Austin to go to a hotel.

Jake goes to the hotel room where he finds Austin having wild sex with a girl, but is shocked to find that it is Priscilla and not Janey, while Les videotapes them with his pants down.  Austin tells Jake that Janey "ran home to her daddy." Jake coldly punches Austin and Priscilla, knocking them unconscious for humiliating Janey. He then punches Les for "being really weird" (and punches a plastic bag floating next to Les); afterwards he runs to Janey's only be told she is on her way to Paris to art school.

Jake arrives at the airport and confronts her before she boards the plane, but uses a plethora of clichéd lines from other films (such as She's All That, Cruel Intentions, American Pie, The Breakfast Club, American Beauty, 10 Things I Hate About You, Can't Hardly Wait, and Pretty in Pink) to convince her to not go. His final (and only original) speech suggests they would be better off separated, but Janey mistakenly believes he is quoting The Karate Kid, and she decides to stay with him.

In a mid-credits scene, Janey's father Mr. Briggs drunkenly assaults himself with pies in his kitchen. In a post-credits scene, a previously seen albino folk singer, an afroed student with a guitar, reveals that she has become blind and calls out for assistance upon completing her song, while an audience member calls for another to assist in stealing her guitar.

Cast

Cameos
Many stars of teen films, as well as those from the 1980s, make credited and uncredited appearances. These include:
 Molly Ringwald as "The Rude, Hot Flight Attendant"; Ringwald starred in many '80s teen films, most significantly Pretty in Pink, Sixteen Candles and The Breakfast Club.
 Mr. T as "The Wise Janitor", a parody of Charles S. Dutton's character from Rudy; The A-Teams opening sequence music is playing at the end of his speech.
 Kyle Cease as "The Slow Clap Guy"; Cease himself played Bogey Lowenstein in 10 Things I Hate About You.
 Melissa Joan Hart (uncredited) as "Slow Clapper's Instructor"; Hart can also be seen in Can't Hardly Wait and Drive Me Crazy.  The commentator at the football game praises Hart and Sabrina the Teenage Witch.
 Lyman Ward as Mr. Wyler; Ward played Ferris Bueller's father in Ferris Bueller's Day Off.
 Paul Gleason as Richard "Dick" Vernon; Gleason reprises his role as Vernon from The Breakfast Club.
 Sean Patrick Thomas as "The Other Token Black Guy"; Thomas appeared in Can't Hardly Wait, Cruel Intentions and Save the Last Dance.
 Good Charlotte as the band playing at the prom.

Parodies 

 Grease (1978)
 Airplane! (1980)
 My Bodyguard (1980)
 Fast Times at Ridgemont High (1982)
 Porky's (1982)
 Risky Business (1983)
 The Karate Kid (1984)
 Repo Man (1984)
 Sixteen Candles (1984)
 Better Off Dead (1985)
 The Breakfast Club (1985)
 Just One of the Guys (1985)
 Ferris Bueller's Day Off (1986)
 Lucas (1986)
 Pretty in Pink (1986)
 Can't Buy Me Love (1987)
 Three O'Clock High (1987)
 License to Drive (1988)
 Heathers (1988)
 The Naked Gun: From the Files of Police Squad! (1988)
 Dazed and Confused (1993)
 Rudy (1993)
 Clueless (1995)
 Independence Day (1996)
 Can't Hardly Wait (1998)
 The Faculty (1998)
 Pleasantville (1998)
 10 Things I Hate About You (1999)
 American Beauty (1999)
 American Pie (1999)
 Cruel Intentions (1999)
 Detroit Rock City (1999)
 Deuce Bigalow: Male Gigolo (1999)
 Drop Dead Gorgeous (1999)
 Election (1999)
 Jawbreaker (1999)
 Never Been Kissed (1999)
 She's All That (1999)
 Varsity Blues (1999)
 Almost Famous (2000)
 Bring It On (2000)
 Dude, Where's My Car? (2000)
 Road Trip (2000)
 Unbreakable (2000)
 Save the Last Dance (2001)
 Summer Catch (2001)

Music

The film's score is composed by Theodore Shapiro and consists largely of contemporary covers of 1980s pop and new wave. The musical number, "Prom Tonight", written by Ben Folds, Michael G. Bender, Adam Jay Epstein and Andrew Jacobson, is a parody of Grease. The song was never released commercially.

A soundtrack was released by Maverick Records on December 4, 2001. A cover of a-ha's "Take On Me" by the band Lifer was recorded but went unreleased.

A karaoke version of the ending to Can't Fight this Feeling by REO Speedwagon is used each time Amanda Becker enters a scene. 

Songs not included in the soundtrack include "Line Up" by Elastica, "In Between Days" and "Turning Japanese" by Face to Face, "Lucy", "Don't You Forget About Me", "Everybody Knows Everything" and "Friends" by Sprung Monkey, "Yoo Hoo" by Imperial Teen, "Double Dare Ya" by Bikini Kill, "Rock Star" by Everclear, "Oh Yeah" by Yello, "Kiss Me" by Sixpence None the Richer, "Let's Go" by the Cars, "Pacific Coast Party" by Smash Mouth, "Let's Begin (Shoot the Shit)" by Bad Ronald, "True" and "King of Yesterday" by Jude, "900 Number" by The 45 King, "My Hero" by Foo Fighters, "I Want Candy", "Put Your Head on My Shoulder" and "Footloose" by Good Charlotte, "Space Age Love Song" by No Motiv, and "If You Were Here" by Thompson Twins.

Release
Not Another Teen Movie opened theatrically on December 14, 2001. It was released on region 1 DVD on April 30, 2002, with an "unrated extended version" on July 26, 2005. This cut runs ten minutes longer than the original, and adds a number of deleted, alternate and extended scenes.

Box office
The film opened at third place at the US box office taking $12.6 million in its opening weekend. It grossed $38.3 million domestically and $28.2 million internationally, for a worldwide total of $66.5 million.

Critical response
Rotten Tomatoes gave the film an approval rating of 28% based on 96 reviews, with an average rating of 4/10. The site's critics consensus states: "NATM has some funny moments, but the movie requires the audience to have familiarity with the movies being spoofed and a tolerance for toilet and sexual humor to be truly effective." Metacritic gave the film a weighted average score of 32 out of 100 based on 22 critics, indicating "generally unfavorable reviews". Audiences polled by CinemaScore gave the film an average grade of "C+" on an A+ to F scale.

Roger Ebert of the Chicago Sun-Times gave the film two stars out of a possible four, and admitted to laughing a few times but not as much as he did for American Pie or Scary Movie. Ebert also criticized the scatological humor. He urged audiences to not waste their time on the film, when in the month of December 2001 there were "21 other promising films" to choose from.

Robin Rauzi of the Los Angeles Times called it "a 90-minute exercise in redefining the word 'gratuitous'" and suggested it is most likely to appeal to fourteen-year-olds – "who of course [are] not supposed to be seeing this R-rated movie". Dennis Harvey of Variety criticized the film for its "overall tendency to mistake mere bad taste for outrageousness, and plain referentiality for satire" but praised Evans, Pressly, and Olsen for giving performances better than the material. He noted that the film follows the model of Scary Movie but lacked the comic finesse of Anna Faris.

Mick LaSalle of the San Francisco Chronicle called the film "a crass act" and pointed out the futility of trying to parody films that are already absurd. LaSalle complained that the film too closely copies She's All That, calling it "pathetic" that Not Another Teen Movie is just another formulaic teen movie.

See also
 Scary Movie (film series) (2000–13)
 Date Movie (2006)
 Epic Movie (2007)
 Meet the Spartans (2008)
 Disaster Movie (2008)
 Dance Flick (2009)
 Vampires Suck (2010)
 The Starving Games (2013)
 Best Night Ever (2013)
 Superfast! (2015)

References

External links

 
 
 
 
 

2001 films
2001 comedy films
2001 directorial debut films
2000s American films
2000s English-language films
2000s high school films
2000s parody films
2000s teen sex comedy films
American high school films
American parody films
American sex comedy films
American teen comedy films
The Breakfast Club
Cheerleading films
Columbia Pictures films
Films about proms
Films directed by Joel Gallen
Films produced by Neal H. Moritz
Films scored by Theodore Shapiro
Films set in airports
Films set in California
Films shot in Los Angeles
Incest in film
Original Film films